Tour de Force is an album by jazz saxophonist Sonny Rollins containing his final recordings for the Prestige label. Rollins performed with Kenny Drew, George Morrow, and Max Roach, with vocals by Earl Coleman on two tracks.

Reception

The AllMusic review by Scott Yanow states: "Rollins was in consistently creative form during this prime period but the overall set is not as classic as most of the tenor's other recordings from the 1950s." The Penguin Guide to Jazz describes it as being "almost as good as Colossus, with the ferocious abstractions of 'B Swift' and 'B Quick' contrasting with the methodical, almost surgical destruction of 'Sonny Boy'."

Track listing
All compositions by Sonny Rollins except as indicated
 "Ee-Ah" - 6:52
 "B. Quick" - 9:13
 "Two Different Worlds" (Al Frisch, Sid Wayne) - 7:37
 "B. Swift" - 5:15
 "My Ideal" (Newell Chase, Leo Robin, Richard A. Whiting) - 4:21
 "Sonny Boy" (Lew Brown, Buddy DeSylva, Ray Henderson, Al Jolson) - 8:22 Bonus track on CD rerelease

Personnel
Sonny Rollins – tenor saxophone
Kenny Drew - piano
George Morrow - bass
Max Roach - drums
Earl Coleman - vocals (tracks 3 & 5)

References

1956 albums
Prestige Records albums
Sonny Rollins albums
Albums recorded at Van Gelder Studio
Albums produced by Bob Weinstock